Cueva de los Tayos (Spanish, "Cave of the Oilbirds") is a cave located on the eastern slopes of the Andes mountains in the Morona-Santiago province of Ecuador.  It is sometimes called Cueva de los Tayos de Coangos (the Río Coangos is nearby).

Description 
Located at an elevation of about  within thinly-bedded limestone and shale, the principal entrance to Cueva de Los Tayos is within a rainforest at the bottom of a dry valley. It is currently (2023) the longest cave in Ecuador. 

The cave is used by the native Shuar people who descend into the cave each spring using vine ladders and bamboo torches to collect fledgling oilbirds ("guácharos" or "tayos" in Spanish).  Written references to the cave go back as far as 1860 and it was visited by gold-seekers and military personnel in the 1960s.

The cave is located inside the Sindical Center Coangos (formed by native people).

Access to the cave is restricted. It is necessary to obtain permission (access and temporary visit) and pay a tax (designated to improve the communities) in Sucúa, Ecuador, at the Shuar Center Federation. (FICSH: Federación Interprovincial de Centros Shuar)

The Gold of the Gods 
A 1969 expedition to the cave is described in Pino Turolla’s 1970 book Beyond the Andes. Erich von Däniken wrote in his 1973 book The Gold of the Gods that János Juan Móricz (1923–1991) had claimed to have explored Cueva de los Tayos in 1969 and discovered mounds of gold, unusual sculptures and a metallic library.  These items were said to be in artificial tunnels that had been created by a lost civilization with help from extraterrestrial beings.  Von Däniken had previously claimed in his 1968 book, Chariots of the Gods?, that extraterrestrials were involved in ancient civilizations.

1976 BCRA expedition 
As a result of the claims published in von Däniken’s book, an investigation of Cueva de los Tayos was organized by Stan Hall of Scotland, in 1976. One of the largest and most expensive cave explorations ever undertaken, the expedition involved over a hundred people, including experts in a variety of fields, British and Ecuadorian military personnel, a film crew, and former American astronaut Neil Armstrong. The team also included eight experienced British cavers who thoroughly explored the cave and conducted an accurate survey to produce a detailed map of it.  There was no evidence of Von Däniken’s more exotic claims, although some physical features of the cave did approximate his descriptions and some items of zoological, botanical, and archaeological interest were found. The lead researcher met with Moricz's indigenous source, who claimed that they had investigated the wrong cave, and that the real cave was secret.

2018 Expedition Unknown episode 
On 31 January 2018, Tayos Cave was featured on the 6th episode of the 4th season of Expedition Unknown, titled "Hunt for the Metal Library". Explorer Josh Gates and his team, helped by local Shuar and Eileen Hall, daughter of Stan Hall of the earlier expedition, headed to Ecuador to explore the depths of the cavern.

References

Further reading 
 Frankland, John, "The Los Tayos Expedition" Caving International No 1, 1978
 AtlasGreat Caves of the World Cave Books, 1989, p. 58 
 von Däniken, Erich, Gold of the Gods Bantam Books, 1974

External links 

 Nexus Magazine article
 Stan Hall's Goldlibrary website
 
 

Caves of Ecuador
Limestone caves
Wild caves
Geography of Morona-Santiago Province
Pseudoarchaeology